Nicolae Oaidă (born 9 April 1933) is a Romanian former footballer and manager.

Career
Nicolae Oaidă was born in Bod, Brașov on 9 April 1933 and started playing football in 1946 at the youth center of Steagul Roșu Brașov, later in 1950 moving to Locomotiva Brașov. He made his Divizia A debut on 16 May 1954 playing for Dinamo Brașov in a 3–0 loss against Locomotiva Timișoara. After one season at Dinamo Brașov, Oaidă went to play for two seasons at Dinamo Bacău, managing to help the team earn a promotion to the first league in his first season spent there. In 1957 he went to play for Progresul București, a team where he would spend the rest of his career, playing for 12 seasons, including one in the second division, earning a total of 226 league appearances and 77 goals scored. Oaidă opened the score in the 2–0 victory against Dinamo Obor București in the 1960 Cupa României final, which helped Progresul win the first trophy in the club's history. He has a total of 236 matches played and 79 goals scored in Divizia A, also making two appearances for Progresul in the 1961–62 European Cup Winners' Cup. In 2008 Oaidă received the title of honorary president of Progresul București, on the occasion of his 75th birthday, in recognition of his entire activity at the club from Cotroceni.

International career
Nicolae Oaidă played six games at international level for Romania, making his debut on 14 September 1958 under coach Augustin Botescu in a 3–2 away loss against East Germany. He played in the two games against Turkey at the Euro 1960 qualifiers, in the first match he opened the score in a 3–0 home victory in Bucharest on the 23 August Stadium. He also appeared once for Romania's Olympic team at the 1960 Summer Olympics qualifiers.

International goals
Scores and results list Romania's goal tally first, score column indicates score after each Nicolae Oaidă goal.

Honours

Player
Dinamo Bacău
Divizia B: 1955
Progresul București
Divizia B: 1965–66
Cupa României: 1959–60, runner-up 1957–58

Notes

References

External links

Nicolae Oaidă at Labtof.ro

1933 births
Living people
Romanian footballers
Olympic footballers of Romania
Romania international footballers
Association football forwards
Liga I players
Liga II players
FC Brașov (1936) players
AS CFR Brașov players
Unirea Tricolor București players
FCM Bacău players
FC Progresul București players
Romanian football managers
Romanian expatriate football managers
Libya national football team managers
FC Progresul București managers
CSM Jiul Petroșani managers
AFC Rocar București managers
CSM Deva managers
Hassania Agadir managers